O Holy Night: Christmas with the Tabernacle Choir & Orchestra at Temple Square was recorded during The Tabernacle Choir at Temple Square's 2021 Christmas shows in the LDS Conference Center, featuring soprano Megan Hilty and actor Neal McDonough. An album, concert DVD, and companion book were released on October 28, 2022. The recorded concert will be broadcast on PBS and BYUtv.

Track listing

Charts

References

2022 Christmas albums
Christmas albums by American artists
Tabernacle Choir albums